The 2009-10 Women's National Hockey team will represent the United States at the 2010 Winter Olympic Games. The head coach is Mark Johnson from the University of Wisconsin. Assisting him are Dave Flint and Jodi McKenna.

News and notes
January 14, 2010: Two-time Olympian Natalie Darwitz will be the captain of the U.S. women's hockey team. Four-time Olympic veterans Angela Ruggiero and Jenny Potter will be alternate captains along with two-time Olympian Julie Chu. Darwitz was the American captain during the past two international seasons, leading the U.S. team to IIHF world championships in 2008 and 2009. The former University of Minnesota Golden Gopher has played in 197 games for the American team, scoring 231 points.
January 20, 2010: Four-time Olympic hockey player Angela Ruggiero is among nine current and former athletes standing for election to become members of the IOC in Vancouver next month.  The results will be announced on Feb. 24. The winning candidates will replace Pernilla Wiberg of Sweden and Manuela Di Centa of Italy, whose eight-year terms have ended. Ruggiero is seeking to become the third IOC member from the U.S., joining Jim Easton and Anita DeFrantz.
January 25, 2010: Kerry Weiland and eight other members of the U.S. Women's Olympic hockey team shared tales of their childhood and dreams of their future with the students from University Avenue Elementary School in Blaine, Minnesota. In addition, the players joined forces with the U.S. Olympic Committee's Team for Tomorrow humanitarian relief fund to donate 15 digital cameras to the school, and contributed 25 laptops on behalf of USA Hockey.
Heading into the 2010 Olympics, Angela Ruggiero holds the record for the number of hockey games played by any Team USA member, male or female.
February 25: Angela Ruggiero was elected by her peers to represent all Olympic athletes on the International Olympic Committee Athletes Commission.
April 19: Meghan Duggan threw the first pitch at a Boston Red Sox game before a sellout Patriots Day crowd of 37,609. Her teammates Erika Lawler, Jessie Vetter of Wisconsin, Brianne McLaughlin, Julie Chu, Karen Thatcher, Molly Schaus, Hilary Knight, and Caitlin Cahow were also on the mound when Duggan threw the pitch.
April 20: The US team attended the opening reception for the United States Vancouver Olympic team Washington, D.C. celebration at the Sports Legends Museum at Camden Yards on April 20, 2010, in Baltimore, Maryland.

Schedule

Qwest Tour
Kelli Stack was named U.S. Player of the Game in the February 4th match against Finland.

Qwest Tour roster

2009 Canada Cup
All games were held at General Motors Place in Vancouver, British Columbia.

NCAA exhibition games
Throughout the season, various NCAA schools will play the United States Olympic Hockey team. In the game against Wisconsin, former Wisconsin player Jinelle-Zaugg-Siergiej netted a goal and had an assist as the Americans got the win.

Four Nations Cup
All games to be held in Finland.

2010 Olympics
December 17: At the Mall of America, in Bloomington, Minnesota, 21 players were named to the 2010 U.S. Olympic Women's Ice Hockey Team. Selections Jenny Potter and Angela Ruggiero will both be playing in their fourth Olympic Games in Vancouver. Hilary Knight is the youngest U.S. player at 20 years old, marking the first time that a U.S. Olympic Women's Ice Hockey Team will not include a teenager at the Games. Jocelyne and Monique Lamoureux will be the first set of twins ever to play hockey in the Olympics.

Overall, the roster includes 6 former Olympians, 8 players who have competed in the Western Women's Hockey League, and 19 returnees from the 2009 U.S. Women's National Team. From an NCAA perspective, 11 members of the team were NCAA Division I players in 2008-09, and 10 of the 11 participated in the 2009 NCAA tournament. Other NCAA facts include that 9 members were NCAA national champions, 7 were participants in the 2009 NCAA Women's Frozen Four, 4 were winners of the 2009 NCAA National Championship, and there are 3 Patty Kazmaier Memorial Award recipients.

Final roster
Rachel Drazan and Angie Keseley were not selected for the Olympic team.
 Angela Ruggiero and forward Jenny Potter are the only players who have been members of every US women's team since the inaugural Olympic tournament at the 1998 Games.
 Ruggiero will enter the Vancouver Olympics as the all-time leader in games played for Team USA.
 Jenny Potter is the only mother on Team USA. Her daughter Madison is eight, and son Cullen is two.

Schedule

Player stats

Skaters

Goaltenders

Under-18 team

Standings

Schedule

Awards and honors
Media All-Star Team:
D – Angela Ruggiero
D – Molly Engstrom
F – Jenny Potter
Directorate Awards were also announced:
Best Defenceman: Molly Engstrom
Under 18 team
Kendall Coyne Best Forward by the Directorate
Alex Rigsby, Best Goalie by the Directorate

See also
 2010–11 United States women's national ice hockey team
 United States women's national ice hockey team

References

External links
 Women's Hockey pages on Hockey Federation website

United States Women's National Ice Hockey Team, 2009-10
United States women
United States women's national ice hockey team